The 100 (pronounced The Hundred) is an American post-apocalyptic science fiction drama television series that premiered on March 19, 2014 on The CW, and ended on September 30, 2020. Developed by Jason Rothenberg, the series is loosely based on the young adult novel series of the same name by Kass Morgan. The 100 follows post-apocalyptic survivors from a space habitat, the Ark, who return to Earth nearly a century after a devastating nuclear apocalypse. The first people sent to Earth are a group of juvenile delinquents who encounter descendants of survivors of the nuclear disaster on the ground.

The main characters of juvenile prisoners includes Clarke Griffin (Eliza Taylor), Finn Collins (Thomas McDonell), Bellamy Blake (Bob Morley), Octavia Blake (Marie Avgeropoulos), Jasper Jordan (Devon Bostick), Monty Green (Christopher Larkin), and John Murphy (Richard Harmon). Other lead characters include Clarke's mother Dr. Abby Griffin (Paige Turco), Marcus Kane (Henry Ian Cusick), and Chancellor Thelonious Jaha (Isaiah Washington), all of whom are council members on the Ark, and Raven Reyes (Lindsey Morgan), an engineer aboard the Ark.

Plot 

Ninety-seven years after a devastating nuclear apocalypse wipes out most human life on Earth, thousands of people now live in a space station orbiting Earth, which they call the Ark. Three generations have been born in space, but when life-support systems on the Ark begin to fail, one hundred juvenile detainees are sent to Earth in a last attempt to determine whether it is habitable, or at least save resources for the remaining residents of the Ark. They discover that some survived the apocalypse: the Grounders, who live in clans locked in a power struggle; the Reapers, another group of grounders who have been turned into cannibals by the Mountain Men; and the Mountain Men, who live in Mount Weather, descended from those who locked themselves away before the apocalypse. Under the leadership of Clarke and Bellamy, the juveniles attempt to survive the harsh surface conditions, battle hostile grounders and establish communication with the Ark.

In the second season, forty-eight of the remaining detainees are captured and taken to Mount Weather by the Mountain Men. These are transfusing blood from imprisoned grounders as an anti-radiation treatment as their bodies have not adapted to deal with the remaining radiation on Earth. Medical tests of the forty-eight show their bone marrow will allow the Mountain Men to survive outside containment, so they begin taking the youths' bone marrow. Meanwhile, the inhabitants of the Ark have crash-landed various stations on Earth and begin an alliance with the grounders to save both their people, naming the main settlement at Alpha Station "Camp Jaha". The season ends with the massacre of the Mountain Men to save the prisoners. During this time, former Chancellor Jaha leads a group in search of a fabled "City of Light". Jaha discovers an artificial intelligence named A.L.I.E. while John Murphy finds an alarming video implying a connection between the AI and the destruction of the world.

In the third season, Alpha Station renamed Arkadia, comes under new management when Pike, a former teacher, and mentor on the Ark, is elected as chancellor and begins a war with the grounders. Pike kills an encampment of grounder warriors while they sleep, which further damages their already fragile relationship with the grounders. Furthermore, the grounder commander Lexa is killed by her mentor during a failed assassination attempt on Clarke, with whom she was romantically involved. A.L.I.E. who was commanded to make life better for mankind is revealed to have responded to the problem of human overpopulation by launching the nuclear apocalypse that devastated Earth, and begins to use ingestible computer chips to take control of peoples' minds. A.L.I.E. is ultimately destroyed by Clarke, but not before warning of another impending apocalyptic disaster.

In the fourth season, two dozen nuclear reactors around the world are melting down due to decades of neglect that will result in the majority of the planet becoming uninhabitable. Clarke and the others search for ways to survive the coming wave of radiation. When it is discovered that the grounders with black blood – known as the Nightbloods – can metabolize radiation, Clarke and the others attempt to recreate the formula, but fail to test it. An old bunker is discovered that can protect 1,200 people for over five years from the new apocalypse; each of the twelve clans selects a hundred people to stay in the bunker. A small group decides to return to space and attempt to survive in the remnants of the Ark. Clarke, who is now a nightblood, remains on the Earth's surface alone.

In the fifth season, six years after the meltdown of the nuclear reactors, a prisoner transport ship arrives in the only green spot left on Earth, where Clarke has been living with Madi, a young Nightblood grounder who also survived the wave of radiation that swept the planet after the meltdown. Those who survived in space and in the bunker have returned safely on the ground. A struggle for the Shallow Valley between the prisoners and a new, united clan, known as Wonkru, begins, resulting in a battle ending with the valley being destroyed. The survivors escape to space and go into cryosleep while they wait for the Earth to recover. However, Monty believes that Earth will apparently never recover and, before dying of old age, sets the prison ship on a course for a new world.

In the sixth season, after 125 years in cryosleep, Clarke, Bellamy, and the others wake up to find out that they are no longer orbiting Earth and have been brought to a new habitable world, Alpha, also known as Sanctum. After landing on this world, they discover a new society, led by ruling families known as the Primes. They also discover new dangers in this new world, and a mysterious rebel group, known as the Children of Gabriel as well as a mysterious Anomaly. Clarke falls victim to the Primes and ends up in a battle with one for control of her body, a fight which she ultimately wins. The season ends with the deaths of most of the Primes, but also with the loss of Abby Griffin and Marcus Kane. Throughout the season, Madi is haunted through the Flame AI by the spirit of the Dark Commander, an evil grounder leader that had ruled when Indra was a child. In order to save Madi, Raven is forced to destroy the Flame, but the Dark Commander escapes.

The seventh season finds the inhabitants of Sanctum trying to find a way to live together in peace following the aftermath of the events of the previous season while battling the resurrected Dark Commander. At the same time, Clarke and others come into conflict with the mysterious Disciples, humans from another world who are convinced that Clarke holds the key to winning the last war that is coming. The season also explores the mysterious Anomaly introduced in the sixth season, now identified as a wormhole linking six planets, one of them being a regenerated Earth, together. After vanishing and being believed dead for some time, Bellamy returns but converts to the Disciple cause, having gone through a life-changing experience while stuck in the cold and treacherous mountains. After returning and converting to the Disciple cause, this leads to his death at Clarke's hands. At the end of the series, the Dark Commander is permanently killed by Indra and humanity achieves Transcendence aside from Clarke who committed murder during the test. They find out the test isn't an actual war, but a way to join the alien hive mind, which is a peaceful universal consciousness that grants immortality. Clarke returns to Earth where her surviving friends and Octavia's new boyfriend Levitt choose to join her to live out their lives, so that Clarke will not be alone. They will not have children, due to their infertility and sterility, and the series ends with Clarke's group being the last humans to ever live on the mortal plane of existence, on a pristine Earth, which is now habitable again.

Cast and characters

 Eliza Taylor as Clarke Griffin
 Paige Turco as Abigail "Abby" Griffin (seasons 1–6; guest season 7)
 Thomas McDonell as Finn Collins (seasons 1–2)
 Eli Goree as Wells Jaha (season 1; guest season 2)
 Marie Avgeropoulos as Octavia Blake
 Bob Morley as Bellamy Blake
 Kelly Hu as Callie "Cece" Cartwig (season 1)
 Christopher Larkin as Monty Green (seasons 1–5; guest season 6)
 Devon Bostick as Jasper Jordan (seasons 1–4)
 Isaiah Washington as Thelonious Jaha (seasons 1–5)
 Henry Ian Cusick as Marcus Kane (seasons 1–6)
 Lindsey Morgan as Raven Reyes (seasons 2–7; recurring season 1)
 Ricky Whittle as Lincoln (seasons 2–3; recurring season 1)
 Richard Harmon as John Murphy (seasons 3–7; recurring seasons 1–2)
 Zach McGowan as Roan (season 4; recurring season 3; guest season 7)
 Tasya Teles as Echo / Ash (seasons 5–7; guest seasons 2–3; recurring season 4)
 Shannon Kook as Jordan Green (seasons 6–7; guest season 5)
 JR Bourne as Russell Lightbourne / Malachi / Sheidheda (season 7; recurring season 6)
 Chuku Modu as Gabriel Santiago (season 7; recurring season 6)
 Shelby Flannery as Hope Diyoza (season 7; guest season 6)

Notes

Episodes

The 100 premiered on March 19, 2014. On May 8, 2014, The CW renewed The 100 for a second season, which premiered on October 22, 2014. On January 11, 2015, The CW renewed the series for a third season, which premiered on January 21, 2016. On March 12, 2016, The 100 was renewed for a fourth season of 13 episodes, which premiered on February 1, 2017. On March 10, 2017, The CW renewed the series for a fifth season, which premiered on April 24, 2018. On May 9, 2018, the series was renewed for a sixth season, which premiered on April 30, 2019. On April 24, 2019, The CW renewed the series for a seventh season, that would consist of 16 episodes and premiered on May 20, 2020. In August 2019, it was announced the seventh season would be the final season, finishing the show with a total of 100 episodes across all seven seasons.

Production

Filming
Filming for the series takes place in and around Vancouver, British Columbia, Canada. Production on the pilot occurred during the second quarter of 2013. After the show received a series order, filming occurred for the first season between August 2013 and January 2014. Filming for the second season commenced on July 7, 2014, and concluded on January 23, 2015. The third season was filmed between July 15, 2015, and February 2, 2016. Filming for the fourth season commenced on August 2, 2016, and concluded on January 18, 2017. Filming for the fifth season commenced on August 14, 2017, and wrapped up on January 27, 2018.

Post-production work, including ADR recording for the series, was done at the Cherry Beach Sound recording studio.
David J. Peterson, who created Dothraki and Valyrian for Game of Thrones, developed the Trigedasleng language for The Grounders. Jason Rothenberg said it was similar to Creole English. The language is called "Trig" on the show.
After his constructed language work on Star-Crossed, Peterson was contacted by the producers of The 100 to create a language for the Grounders, an evolution of English. In the setting, 97 years have passed since the apocalypse, which is a very short time for significant language change. Because of this, Peterson posited an accelerated evolution in which the early Grounders used a cant specifically to obfuscate their speech and to differentiate between friend or foe. Trigedasleng derives from that cant and evolved over several short generations of survivors of the apocalypse.

On March 12, 2020, Warner Bros. Television shut down production on all of their shows due to the COVID-19 pandemic, however, writer Kim Shumway confirmed they were able to complete filming for their seventh season.

Casting
In late February 2013, Bob Morley and Eli Goree were cast as Bellamy Blake and Wells Jaha, respectively, followed a day later by the casting of Henry Ian Cusick as Marcus Kane. Less than a week later, Eliza Taylor and Marie Avgeropoulos were cast in co-starring roles as Clarke Griffin and Octavia Blake, respectively. Throughout March, the rest of the cast was filled out, with Paige Turco cast as Abigail Walters (now Abigail Griffin), Isaiah Washington as Chancellor Jaha, Thomas McDonnell as Finn Collins, Kelly Hu as Callie Cartwig, and Christopher Larkin as Monty Green.
For the second season, Adina Porter and Raymond J. Barry were cast in recurring roles as Indra and Dante Wallace, respectively, along with Alycia Debnam-Carey as Lexa.

Broadcast
In Canada, Season 1 of The 100 was licensed exclusively to Netflix. The series premiered on March 20, 2014, the day after the mid-season premiere of Season 1 on the CW.

In New Zealand, the series premiered on TVNZ's on-demand video streaming service on March 21, 2014.

In the UK and Ireland, The 100 premiered on E4 on July 7, 2014. The first episode was viewed by an average audience of 1.39million, making it the channel's biggest ever program launch. Season 2 premiered on January 6, 2015, and averaged 1,118,000 viewers. Season 3 premiered on February 17, 2016.

In Australia, The 100 was originally scheduled to premiere on Go! but instead premiered on Fox8 on September 4, 2014. Season 2 premiered on January 8, 2015.

Home media
Warner Home Entertainment released the first five seasons' DVDs, and the first season's Blu-ray while the remaining five seasons' Blu-rays were released through Warner Archive Collection who also released a manufacture-on-demand DVD for the sixth and seventh seasons.

Reception

Critical response

On Rotten Tomatoes, the show holds a 93 percent average approval rating across its seven seasons.

Its first season has a 76 percent approval rating based on 37 reviews, with an average score of 6.98/10. The site's consensus reads: "Although flooded with stereotypes, the suspenseful atmosphere helps make The 100 a rare high-concept guilty pleasure." On Metacritic, the first season scores 63 out of 100 points, based on 26 critics, indicating "generally favorable reviews". In an early negative review of the first season, Brian Lowry of The Boston Globe said: "Our attraction to Apocalypse TV runs deep, as our culture plays out different futuristic possibilities. That's still no reason to clone material, nor is it a reason to deliver characters who are little more than stereotypes." At the start of the series, Allison Keene of The Hollywood Reporter said the show "has a lot of interesting things to play with in terms of its narrative and world-building, but it chooses to gloss over them", presenting "The CW's ultimate vision for humanity: an Earth populated only by attractive teenagers, whose parents are left out in space." Kelly West of Cinema Blend gave it a more favorable review, noting: "It takes a little while for the series to warm up, but when The 100 begins to hit its stride, a unique and compelling drama begins to emerge." IGNs editor Eric Goldman also gave the show a positive review, writing: "Overcoming most of its early growing pains pretty quickly, The 100 was a very strong show by the end of its first season."

The second season was met with mostly positive reviews and holds a rating of 100 percent on Rotten Tomatoes based on 11 reviews, with an average score of 8.77/10. The site's consensus reads: "The 100 hones all of the things that make it tick for a dynamic second season complete with fast-paced storylines, vivid visuals, and interesting characters to root for – or against." In a review of the second-season finale, Kyle Fowle of The A.V. Club said, "Very few shows manage to really push the boundaries of moral compromise in a way that feels legitimately difficult. [...] The 100 has done the same, presenting a finale that doesn't shy away from the morally complex stakes it's spent a whole season building up." Maureen Ryan of The Huffington Post, wrote: "I've rarely seen a program demonstrate the kind of consistency and thematic dedication that The 100 has shown in its first two seasons. This is a show about moral choices and the consequences of those choices, and it's been laudably committed to those ideas from Day 1." IGNs Eric Goldman said the second season "elevated the series into the upper echelon, as the show become one of the coolest and most daring series on TV these days". In Variety, Ryan named The 100 one of the best shows of 2015.

The third season received an overall rating of 83 percent based on 12 reviews, with an average rating of 7.29/10. The critical consensus is, "The 100 goes macro in season 3, skillfully expanding the literal scope of the setting and figurative moral landscape." Varietys Maureen Ryan stated in an early review of the season: "The show is more politically complicated than ever, and the world-building that accompanies the depiction of various factions, alliances and conflicts is generally admirable." In a review of the third-season finale, Mariya Karimjee of Vulture wrote: "Every moment of this finale is pitch-perfect: the choreography of the fight scenes, the plotting and pacing, and the stunning way in which the episode finally reaches it apex. [The episode] elevates the season's themes and pulls together its disparate story lines, setting us up nicely for season four." In his review of the finale and the season overall, Fowle of The A.V. Club stated: "This has been a rocky season. The first half of it was defined by shoddy character motivations and oversized villains. The second half has done some work to bring the show back from the brink, [...] paying off with "a thrilling, forward-thinking finale that provides some necessary closure to this season."

The fourth season received a 93 percent on Rotten Tomatoes, with an average rating of 8.22/10 based on 14 reviews. The site's consensus reads, "Season 4 of The 100 rewards longtime viewers with a deeper look at their favorite characters, as well as adding exceptional nuance and depth to their thrilling circumstances." The latter half of the fourth season received better reception than the first, with the episodes "Die All, Die Merrily" and "Praimfaya" often cited as the  best episodes of the season. "Die All, Die Merrily" has a 9.5/10 rating from IGN, a 5/5 rating from Vulture, and an A rating from The AV Club. "Praimfaya" has a 9.0/10 from IGN and an A rating from The AV Club.

On Rotten Tomatoes, the fifth season has a 100 percent with an average of 8.31/10, based on 13 reviews. The site's consensus is, "Five years in, The 100 manages to top itself once again with a audacious, addicting season." In a 4.5/5 review from Den of Geek, the third episode "Sleeping Giants" is described as a "good ol' fashioned episode of The 100", praising its balance of action, humour, and rich relationships.

The sixth season also has a 100 percent on Rotten Tomatoes, averaging a score of 7.20/10 based on 10 reviews. The site's consensus is, "The 100 successfully resets its game, proving that conflict lies within these characters rather than their environment, and sows the seeds for a killer final season." In particular, the sixth season's change of scenery was the subject of a range of reactions. Nicolene Putter of Cultured Vultures praised the new storylines, stating "the cutthroat plotlines will always have you sitting on the edge of your seat", and Selina Wilken of Hypable praised the season premiere for, despite introducing a lot of new information, overall being "a solid opening hour of a semi-reset version of The 100". On the other hand, Yana Grebenyuk of TV Fanatic criticized the various subplots, referring to the season finale "The Blood of Sanctum" as "a collective statement on what happens when there's too much plot and not enough time found to pace it".

The seventh season has a 100 percent rating on Rotten Tomatoes, with an average score of 7.50/10 based on 8 reviews. While the earlier episodes of season seven, such as the backdoor pilot to the cancelled prequel series "Anaconda", were generally met with praise, the later episodes and in particular the season and series finale received backlash. The 13th episode, "Blood Giant", was panned by critics and fans alike for its killing of Bellamy, one of the show's leads since the first season. Grebenyuk called the episode out for "undermin[ing] the two leads, their love for one another, and the show's entire message"; Den of Geek reviewer Delia Harrington viewed his re-characterization and subsequent death as "baffling". The season's final episode and series finale, "The Last War", was also widely criticized as an ineffective end to the series. Zack Giaimo of FanSided writes "despite some good scenes, the series finale of The 100 wastes a lot of the character development of the last seven seasons". In a more positive review, a SpoilerTV reviewer said that while the finale was not without mistakes, it was enough to satisfy long-time viewers and gave the leads a happy ending.

In 2016, Rolling Stone ranked the show #36 on its list of the "40 Best Science Fiction TV Shows of All Time".

"Bury your gays" controversy 
In 2016, the series and showrunner Jason Ruthenberg faced widespread controversy when Lexa, the leader of the Grounders and the show's lesbian character, was killed off in the third-season episode "Thirteen". Critics and fans considered the death and the way it was written a continuation of the persistent bury your gays trope in television, in which LGBT characters, especially queer women, are killed off far more often than others, implicitly portraying them as disposable and existing primarily to serve the stories of straight characters or to attract viewers. Lexa's death occurring immediately after having sex with Clarke received particular criticism. A widespread debate about the trope among media, writers and viewers ensued, with Lexa's death cited as a prime example of the trope and why it should end. Rothenberg eventually wrote in response, "I [...] write and produce television for the real world where negative and hurtful tropes exist. And I am very sorry for not recognizing this as fully as I should have." Additionally, Debnam-Carey's concurrent role in the series Fear the Walking Dead was presented as an off-screen reason for Lexa's death.

Ratings

An estimated 2.7million American viewers watched the series premiere, which received an 18–49 rating of 0.9, making it the most-watched show in its time slot on The CW since 2010, with the series Life Unexpected.

Accolades

Cancelled prequel series
In October 2019, Rothenberg began developing a prequel series to The 100 for The CW. A backdoor pilot episode was ordered; "Anaconda" aired July 8, 2020, as an episode of the seventh and final season of The 100. The prequel series was to show the events 97 years before the original series, beginning with the nuclear apocalypse that wiped out almost all life on Earth.

In February 2020, it was reported that Iola Evans, Adain Bradley, and Leo Howard had been cast as Callie, Reese, and August, respectively.

In January 2021, Deadline reported that The 100 prequel was still being considered. In May 2021, according to Mark Pedowitz of The CW, the spinoff was still under consideration by the network. In November 2021, it was reported that The CW had decided not to move forward with the prequel series.

References

External links

 
 

 
2010s American LGBT-related drama television series
2010s American science fiction television series
2010s American teen drama television series
2020s American LGBT-related drama television series
2020s American science fiction television series
2020s American teen drama television series
2014 American television series debuts
2020 American television series endings
American action adventure television series
Anti-war works
Television series about artificial intelligence
Bisexuality-related television series
Cannibalism in fiction
Cryonics in fiction
Dystopian television series
English-language television shows
Fiction about immortality
Fiction about interracial romance
Lesbian-related television shows
Gay-related television shows
Overpopulation fiction
Post-apocalyptic television series
Post-traumatic stress disorder in fiction
Saturn Award-winning television series
Television shows based on American novels
Television series about colonialism
Television series about cults
Television series about religion
Television series about teenagers
Television series by Warner Bros. Television Studios
Television series by CBS Studios
Television series by Alloy Entertainment
Television shows filmed in Vancouver
Television shows about religion
Television shows set in Fairfax County, Virginia
Television shows set in Virginia
The CW original programming
Serial drama television series
Artificial intelligence in fiction
Fiction about consciousness transfer
LGBT speculative fiction television series